Bank Newton is a small settlement and civil parish in the Craven district of North Yorkshire, England.  According to the 2001 census the parish had a population of 47, and at the 2011 census the population of the civil parish remained less than 100 and therefore its details were included in the civil parish of Gargrave. In 2015, North Yorkshire County Council estimated the population of the parish to be 50.

In 2016, as part of the canal's bicentenary, lock number 38 was officially renamed the 'Mike Clarke Lock' in commemoration to the president of The Leeds and Liverpool Society, Mike Clarke.

A notable historic house is the Grade II listed Newton Grange which now provides holiday cottage accommodation and is a venue for weddings.

References

Civil parishes in North Yorkshire
Craven District
Hamlets in North Yorkshire